Trần Văn Vũ (born 15 April 1994) is a Vietnamese footballer who plays as a centre-back for V.League 2 club Khánh Hòa.

References

1994 births
Living people
Vietnamese footballers
Khanh Hoa FC players
Association football central defenders